The following are the national records in track cycling in Bangladesh, maintained by its national cycling federation, Bangladesh Cycling Federation.

Men

Women

References

Bangladesh
track cycling